Evie Ladin is an American musician, singer-songwriter, percussive dancer, choreographer, square dance caller living in Oakland, California. She performs with The Evie Ladin Band, a trio with Keith Terry and Erik Pearson, and also collaborates with Keith Terry as a duo. Other projects include two all-female groups:  The Stairwell Sisters, an old-time group utilizing clawhammer banjo, guitar, bass and percussive dance; and MoToR/dance. Ladin's 2012 CD titled Evie Ladin Band was voted Americana Album of the Year by the Independent Music Awards (IMAs) Vox Pop Vote. A banjo player since childhood, Ladin features regularly on the annual Banjo Babes compilation album and calendar. Ladin is also the Executive Director of the International Body Music Festival (IBMF), a project of the Oakland-based arts non profit Crosspulse.

Background 
The daughter of an old time and traditional music enthusiast and International Folk Dance Instructor, Ladin and her sister Abby grew up immersed in traditional American music and dance. Summers were spent at either folk festivals or music camps. At home during the later years of American folk music revival, traveling musicians would often stop over for the night. She attended Brown University where she created a major in African Studies in Dance. She later traveled to Nigeria and studied dance on a Fulbright Fellowship. In the early 1990s, Ladin studied jazz and tap in New York followed by eight years working with Ohio-based dance company Rhythm in Shoes.

Ladin's work often explores the intersection of Appalachian music/dance and traditions of the African Diaspora. In 2018, she returned to Africa for the 10th International Body Music Festival (IBMF) in Dzodze, Ghana.

Awards 
 1991 Fulbright Fellowship
 1991 Watson Fellowship
 2012 Americana Album of the Year - Independent Music Awards Vox Pop Fan Vote
 2013 Parents’ Choice Gold Award

Discography 
 Evie Ladin Band: Caught on a Wire (2019)
 Evie Ladin Band: Riding the Rooster (2018)
 Evie Ladin Band: Jump the Fire (2016)
 Buckdancing for Beginners 2: Freestyle (2013)
 Evie Ladin Band, Evie Ladin Band (2012)
 Evie Ladin Band: Float Downstream (2010)
 Stairwell Sisters, Get Off Your Money (2008), Lloyd Maines
 Stairwell Sisters, Feet All Over the Floor (2005), Yodel-Ay-Hee
 Stairwell Sisters, The Stairwell Sisters (2003), Yodel-Ay-Hee
 Crosspulse Percussion Ensemble:  I Like Everything About You, Yes I Do!
 Crosspulse, Professor Terry's Circus Band Extraordináire (with Linda Tillery, David Balakrishnan, George Brooks, Paul Hanson and others)
 Crosspulse, Body Tjak: The Soundtrack (with Indonesian artists)
 Buckdancing for Beginners: The Basics of Southern Appalachian Flatfoot Clogging (2002)
 Banjo Babes

References

External links
 
 

Year of birth missing (living people)
Living people
American banjoists
Women banjoists
American women singer-songwriters
American female dancers
American women choreographers
American choreographers
American singer-songwriters
21st-century American women